Éric Bauthéac (born 24 August 1987) is a French professional footballer who plays as an attacking midfielder for Nea Salamina.

He has also played in France for Saint-Étienne, Lille, Dijon, Nice and Cannes.

Career
Bauthéac scored his first goal for Brisbane Roar in an A-League match against Melbourne City. He left the Roar after the 2018–19 season.

On 25 July 2019, he signed a two-year contract with Omonia Nicosia. He made his debut on 24 August 2019 against Doxa Katokopias in the 2019–20 season premiere and scored the second goal of the match with a direct free kick.

Career statistics

Honours

Omonia
Cypriot First Division: 2020–21
Cypriot Cup: 2021–22
Cypriot Super Cup: 2021

References

External links
 
 

1987 births
Living people
People from Bagnols-sur-Cèze
Sportspeople from Gard
French footballers
Footballers from Occitania (administrative region)
Association football midfielders
Ligue 1 players
Ligue 2 players
A-League Men players
Cypriot First Division players
AS Cannes players
Dijon FCO players
OGC Nice players
Lille OSC players
Brisbane Roar FC players
AC Omonia players
Marquee players (A-League Men)
French expatriate footballers
French expatriate sportspeople in Australia
Expatriate soccer players in Australia
French expatriate sportspeople in Cyprus
Expatriate footballers in Cyprus